War Dog Memorial may refer to:

War Dog Memorial (Bristol Township, Pennsylvania), honoring US service dogs from all wars
National War Dog Cemetery, memorial on Guam honoring US Marine service dogs from World War II
Military Working Dog Teams National Monument, honoring US service dogs and their handlers for all 5 services since World War II